Donald Marland Hewlett (30 August 1920 – 4 June 2011) was a British actor who was best known for his sitcom roles as Colonel Charles Reynolds in It Ain't Half Hot Mum and Lord Meldrum in You Rang, M'Lord?, both written by Jimmy Perry and David Croft. He also had other roles in British film and television productions.

Early life
Hewlett was born into a wealthy family; his father Thomas Hewlett was Conservative MP for Manchester Exchange from 1940 to 1945 and owned the Anchor Chemical Company based in Clayton, Manchester (now a subsidiary of Air Products and Chemicals). He was the brother of Thomas Hewlett, Baron Hewlett.

Hewlett was educated at Clifton College in Bristol followed by St John's College, Cambridge, where he studied geography and meteorology and was part of the Footlights Revue, but volunteered for the RNVR early in World War II. He served in the Royal Navy as a lieutenant and meteorologist. and was stationed for several years in Kirkwall in the Orkney Islands where he was a founder member of the Kirkwall Arts Club. He later served in the North Atlantic aboard the light cruisers Malaya and Galatea. He rose to the rank of lieutenant. He was subsequently posted to Singapore, in charge of Japanese POWs and as entertainment officer.

Career
Following his demob, rather than return to Cambridge University, Hewlett trained at RADA and gained his first professional acting job in repertory theatre at the Oxford Playhouse where he suggested the management should cast Ronnie Barker in his first, small, role. His first film acting role was the part of Lincoln Green in Orders are Orders (1954).

His television appearances included The Ronnie Corbett Show, The Ronnie Barker Playhouse, The Saint, The Avengers, The Dick Emery Show and the Doctor Who story The Claws of Axos (1971). However, he gained his most prominent role in the Croft and Perry sitcom It Ain't Half Hot Mum (1974–81) as Colonel Charles Reynolds. He was cast with Michael Knowles in another David Croft sitcom, the sci-fi parody Come Back Mrs. Noah (1977–78), and later with the successful You Rang, M'Lord? (1988–93), as George, Lord Meldrum (a part written specially for him). 

Hewlett was cast with Knowles again for the BBC Radio series Anything Legal in 1984. Other roles included 'Winkworth' in Morris Minor's Marvellous Motors in 1989 and The Adventures of Brigadier Wellington-Bull. His last TV appearance was in The Upper Hand in 1995. He appeared in several episodes of The Enchanting World of Hinge and Bracket, playing the ship's captain when they embarked on a cruise.

Hewlett also appeared in the episode "Hello Sailor" from the sitcom Happy Ever After in 1977 which starred Terry Scott and June Whitfield.

Hewlett made a number of film appearances including Spike Milligan's Adolf Hitler - My Part in His Downfall, A Touch of Class, Carry On Behind and The First Great Train Robbery.

Hewlett's previous marriages, to Christine Pollon and Diana Greenwood, ended in divorce. He had two sons and a daughter by Greenwood. Having previously lived for several years in Whitstable, Kent, he lived in Fulham, SW London, with his third wife Thérèse McMurray-Hewlett, by whom he had a son and daughter. His younger daughter, Siobhan Hewlett, is an actress, best known for her role in Irina Palm.

Death
Hewlett died on 4 June 2011 at the Chelsea and Westminster Hospital in West London aged 90.

Filmography

Film

Television

References

External links
 

1920 births
2011 deaths
Deaths from pneumonia in England
English male film actors
English male television actors
Male actors from Manchester
People from Whitstable
Alumni of St John's College, Cambridge
People educated at Clifton College
Alumni of RADA
Royal Navy officers of World War II
Royal Naval Volunteer Reserve personnel of World War II
20th-century English male actors
Male actors from Kent